The 2021–22 ISU Grand Prix of Figure Skating was a series of invitational senior internationals held from October 2021 through December 2021. Medals were awarded in the disciplines of men's singles, women's singles, pair skating, and ice dance. Skaters earned points based on their placement at each event and the top six in each discipline qualified to compete at the Grand Prix Final in Osaka, Japan. The Grand Prix Final was cancelled on December 2, 2021, with the possibility of postponement to the end of the season, before being definitively cancelled on December 17.

Organized by the International Skating Union, the series set the stage for the 2022 European, the 2022 Four Continents, and the 2022 World Championships, as well as the 2022 Winter Olympics. The corresponding series for junior-level skaters was the 2021–22 ISU Junior Grand Prix.

Schedule 
The series comprised the following events:

Cancelled

Requirements 
Skaters were eligible to compete on the senior Grand Prix circuit if they had reached the age of 15 before July 1, 2021. They were also required to have earned a minimum total score at certain international events.

Assignments 
Assignments were released on June 29, 2021. Cup of China was cancelled on August 16; the Gran Premio d'Italia was announced as the replacement event on August 27.

Men

Women

Pairs

Ice dance

Changes to preliminary assignments

Skate America

Skate Canada

Gran Premio d'Italia

NHK Trophy

Internationaux de France

Rostelecom Cup

Medal summary

Medalists

Medal standings

Qualification 
At each event, skaters earned points toward qualification for the Grand Prix Final. Following the sixth event, the top six highest scoring skaters/teams advanced to the Final. The points earned per placement were as follows:

There were originally seven tie-breakers in cases of a tie in overall points:
 Highest placement at an event. If a skater placed 1st and 3rd, the tiebreaker is the 1st place, and that beats a skater who placed 2nd in both events.
 Highest combined total scores in both events. If a skater earned 200 points at one event and 250 at a second, that skater would win in the second tie-break over a skater who earned 200 points at one event and 150 at another.
 Participated in two events.
 Highest combined scores in the free skating/free dance portion of both events.
 Highest individual score in the free skating/free dance portion from one event.
 Highest combined scores in the short program/short dance of both events.
 Highest number of total participants at the events.

If a tie remained, it was considered unbreakable and the tied skaters all advanced to the Grand Prix Final.

Qualification standings 
Bold denotes Grand Prix Final qualification.

Qualifiers

Records and achievements

Records 

The following new ISU best scores were set during this season:

Achievements 
 In the women's short program at 2021 Skate Canada,  Kamila Valieva became the 16th woman to land a triple Axel cleanly. In the women's free skating,  Wakaba Higuchi became the 17th woman to accomplish the feat. Valieva also recorded the highest-ever TES for a woman in the free skating, and broke her own ISU records for the free skating and combined scores.
  Loena Hendrickx (bronze at 2021 Gran Premio d'Italia) won Belgium's first Grand Prix medal in women's singles.
 In the women's short program at 2021 NHK Trophy,  Mana Kawabe became the 18th woman to land a triple Axel cleanly.
 In the women's short program at 2021 Rostelecom Cup,  Kamila Valieva recorded the highest-ever TES for a woman and broke the ISU record for the short program score. Valieva also recorded both highest-ever TES and PCS for a woman in the free skating, and broke her own ISU records for the free skating and combined scores.
  Morisi Kvitelashvili (gold at 2021 Rostelecom Cup) won Georgia's first Grand Prix title at the senior level in any discipline.

Top scores

Men

Best total score

Best short program score

Best free skating score

Women

Best total score

Best short program score

Best free skating score

Pairs

Best total score

Best short program score

Best free skating score

Ice dance

Best total score

Best rhythm dance score

Best free dance score

Notes

References

External links 
 ISU Grand Prix at the International Skating Union

ISU Grand Prix of Figure Skating
Grand Prix
Grand Prix